Seyyedabad (also Romanized as Şeyyedābād and Şeydābād) is a village in Khosrow Beyk Rural District, Milajerd District, Komijan County, Markazi Province, Iran.

References 

Populated places in Komijan County